Boscawen may refer to:

 Boscawen (surname)
 Boscawen, New Hampshire, a town in the United States
 Truro Boscawen (electoral division), an electoral division of Cornwall, United Kingdom
 Boscawen Park, a cricket ground in Truro, Cornwall
 Boscawen SSSI, a Site of Special Scientific Interest and a Geological Conservation Review site in Cornwall, United Kingdom.
 Boscawen-Un, a stone circle in Cornwall, United Kingdom
 HMS Boscawen, several ships and a shore establishment
 Boscawen, a British privateer, originally the French frigate Médée (1741), captured by Edward Boscawen in 1744
 Boscawen, pen name of Nathaniel Greene (journalist) (1797–1877)